General elections were held in Paraguay on 11 February 1973. Alfredo Stroessner of the Colorado Party won the presidential elections, whilst the Colorado Party won 20 of the 30 seats in the Senate and 40 of the 60 seats in the Chamber of Deputies. Voter turnout was 77%.

Results

References

Paraguay
1973 in Paraguay
Elections in Paraguay
Presidential elections in Paraguay
Alfredo Stroessner
February 1973 events in South America